Terrence Michael "Terry" Paul (born September 14, 1964, in Oakville, Ontario) is a retired rowing coxswain from Canada. He competed in two consecutive Summer Olympics for his native country, starting in 1988. At his second appearance he was the Coxswain of the team that won the gold medal in the Men's Eights.

Terry has gone on to an extensive coach career in the US College system at Cornell, and then internationally with Canada, Switzerland, and then Canada again.  Most recently, Terry was the coach of the Canadian Men's Pair of Dave Calder and Scott Frandsen at the 2008 Beijing Summer Olympics.  Terry coached the crew to an Olympic Silver Medal.

References

External links
 Canadian Olympic Committee
 

1964 births
Canadian male rowers
Living people
Olympic gold medalists for Canada
Olympic rowers of Canada
People from Oakville, Ontario
Rowers at the 1988 Summer Olympics
Rowers at the 1992 Summer Olympics
Sportspeople from Ontario
Olympic medalists in rowing
Medalists at the 1992 Summer Olympics